Muhammad ibn Ali ibn Muhammad Shabankara'i (c. 1298–1358), better known as Shabankara'i was a Persian poet and historian of Kurdish origin. He wrote in the Persian language and flourished during the late Ilkhanate era.

Biography 
In 1332 or 1333, Shabankara'i completed his general history Majma‛ al-ansāb fī l- tawārīkh ("A Collection of Genealogies in the Histories"), which was dedicated to Ghiyath al-Din Muhammad, the Persian vizier of the Ilkhanate ruler Abu Sa'id Bahadur Khan. However, the work was destroyed during a ransacking of the vizier's house due to the disorder that followed after Abu Sa'id's death. Shabankara'i thus wrote a second version of the work on 17 December 1337. He also composed a third version in 1343, which was dedicated to the Chobanid prince Pir Husayn. The Majma‛ al-ansāb is notable for containing valuable information about the reign of Öljaitü and Abu Sa'id.

Works 
Shabankara'i's positive portrayal of the Mongols in his Majma‛ al-ansāb is a demonstration of the emerging Iranian support that they started to receive since the fall of Baghdad in 1258 and the stability and blossoming that followed:

In his work, Shabankara'i also devotes chapters to local dynasties, such as the Shabankara and Hazaraspids. While there is no evidence of Shabankara'i being associated with the Hazaraspids, he praises their atabeg (ruler) Nusrat al-Din Ahmad like many other contemporary historians:

References

Sources 
 
 
 
  
 
 

Kurdish poets
14th-century Persian-language poets
Ilkhanate-period poets
14th-century Iranian historians
1290s births
1358 deaths
Year of birth uncertain
Ilkhanate historians
14th-century Kurdish people
People from Fars Province
Iranian people of Kurdish descent
Iranian poets